The Apostolic Vicariate (Vicariate Apostolic) of Aguarico, a missionary s-circonscription of the Roman Catholic Church, is located in the Aguarico Canton in Ecuador's Amazon Rainforest.

History 
On 16 November 1953 Pope Pius XII established the Prefecture Apostolic of Aguarico from the Apostolic Vicariate of Napo. It has a cathedral see, the Catedral Nuestra Señora del Carmen, in Puerto Francisco de Orellana, in Orellana Province.
 
Pope John Paul II elevated it to a Vicariate Apostolic on 2 July 1984.

It remains exempt, i.e., immediately subject to the Holy See, not part of any ecclesiastical province.

Episcopal Incumbents 
''So far, all ordinaries have been Friars Minor Capuchin.
Apostolic prefects
 Igino Gamboa, O.F.M. Cap. † (30 March 1954 Appointed – 1965)
 Alejandro Labaca Ugarte, O.F.M. Cap. † (22 Jan. 1965 Appointed – 26 June 1970)
 Jesús Langarica Olagüe, O.F.M. Cap. † (26 June 1970 Appointed – 1982)

Apostolic vicars
 Alejandro Labaca Ugarte, O.F.M. Cap. † (2 July 1984 Appointed – 2 July 1987)
 Jesús Esteban Sádaba Pérez, O.F.M. Cap. (22 Jan. 1990 – 2 Aug 2017)
José Adalberto Jiménez Mendoza, O.F.M. Cap. (2 Aug 2017 - )

See also 
 Roman Catholicism in Ecuador

Sources and References 

Apostolic vicariates
Roman Catholic dioceses in Ecuador
Christian organizations established in 1953